Stephen Miller (born 29 March 1941) is an American author.

Career 
He was formerly a contributing editor to The Wilson Quarterly.

Books

Three Deaths and Enlightenment Thought: Hume, Johnson, Marat (Bucknell University Press, 2001)

Walking New York: Reflections of American Writers from Walt Whitman to Teju Cole (Fordham University Press, 2014)

The Peculiar Life of Sundays (Harvard University Press, 2008)

Conversation: A History of a Declining Art (Yale University Press, 2007)

Excellence & Equity : the National Endowment for the Humanities (University of Kentucky Press, 1984)

References

1941 births
Living people
American essayists